The Aphelinidae are a moderate-sized family of tiny parasitic wasps, with about 1100 described species in some 28 genera. These minute insects are challenging to study, as they deteriorate rapidly after death unless extreme care is taken (e.g., preservation in ethanol), making identification of most museum specimens difficult. The larvae of the majority are primary parasitoids on Hemiptera, though other hosts are attacked, and details of the life history can be variable (e.g., some attack eggs, some attack pupae, and others are hyperparasites). Males and females may have different hosts and different life histories .

They are found throughout the world in virtually all habitats, and are extremely important as biological control agents. The oldest fossils are known from the Eocene aged Baltic Amber.

They are difficult to separate from other Chalcidoidea except by subtle features of the wing venation and other difficult characters, and the family appears to be paraphyletic, so is likely to be split up in the future (e.g., the Calesinae may become a separate family). The families Azotidae and Eriaporidae were recently elevated in rank from subfamilies of Aphelinidae.

Genera

Allomymar
Aphelinus
Aphytis
Bardylis
Botryoideclava
Cales
Centrodora
Coccobius
Coccophagoides
Coccophagus
Dirphys
Encarsia
Eretmocerus
Eriaphytis
Eutrichosomella
Hirtaphelinus
Lounsburyia
Marietta
Marlattiella
Metanthemus
Oenrobia
Proaphelinoides
Prophyscus
Protaphelinus
Pteroptrix
Samariola
Timberlakiella
Verekia

References 

 Yasnosh, V. A., 1983. Review of the world genera of Aphelinidae (Hymenoptera). 1. key to the genera.Entomological Review 62:145-159.

External links 
 Universal Chalcidoidea Database
 Research on Aphelinidae
 a citrus blackfly parasitoid, Encarsia opulenta on the UF / IFAS Featured Creatures Web site
 a citrus whitefly parasitoid, Encarsia lahorensis  on the UF / IFAS Featured Creatures Web site

 
Biological pest control wasps
Apocrita families
Taxa named by Carl Gustaf Thomson
Insects described in 1876